Life with La Toya is an American reality documentary television series on the Oprah Winfrey Network that debuted April 13, 2013 at 10:30/9:30c. It was announced on June 10, 2013, that the Oprah Winfrey Network ordered a twelve-episode second season.

Premise
Life with La Toya opens a view into the daily life of La Toya Jackson. The series chronicles Jackson as she settles into her newest home, expands her business portfolio and dives back into the dating scene in order to create her own family. It also features La Toya telling the stories of her past such as her ex-husband and the death of her brother. Contrary to reports, Michael Jackson's children only appear in one episode and are not featured within the series.

Episodes

Series overview

Season 1 (2013)

Season 2 (2014)

Specials

Broadcast
In Australia, the program is available for streaming through PLUS7, the official streaming application of Seven Network.

References

External links
 
 

2010s American reality television series
2013 American television series debuts
English-language television shows
Oprah Winfrey Network original programming
2014 American television series endings